Spider Webb (born Kenneth Ronald Rice; June 15, 1944) is an American jazz drummer and session musician.

Biography
Spider Webb, aka Kenneth Rice, began playing drums at an early age in his home town of Detroit. Before leaving the motor city, he recorded with United Artists and Holland-Dozier-Holland. He moved to New York in 1967 where he quickly gained prominence as a studio drummer. Webb was hired on the spot by King Curtis and became the drummer for Harry Belafonte, from 1969 through 1972.  In 1972, he played in a band backing David Clayton-Thomas, with Smitty Smith, Chuck Rainey, and Danny Kortchmar.

He has also recorded with Freddie Hubbard, Robert Palmer, The Temptations, Aretha Franklin, Grover Washington, Jr, Labelle, Herb Alpert and Hugh Masekela, among others.

Webb was once married to Carol Kaye, with whom he founded the soul-jazz group Spiders Webb.

Selected discography

As sideman
1972: Moon Shadow – Labelle (Warner Bros., BS 2618)
1974: Northern Windows – Hampton Hawes (Prestige)
1975: Feels So Good – Grover Washington, Jr. (Kudu Records)
1976: Some People Can Do What They Like – Robert Palmer (Island Records, ILPS 9420)
1978: Herb Alpert / Hugh Masekela (Horizon, 1978)

As leader
1976: I Don’t Know What’s On Your Mind - Spiders Webb (Fantasy - F 9517)

Bibliography

References

External links

1944 births
Living people
Musicians from Detroit
American jazz drummers
20th-century American drummers
American male drummers
Jazz musicians from Michigan
20th-century American male musicians
American male jazz musicians